"Broken Land" is a song by Northern Irish band the Adventures, released in 1988 as the first single from their second album The Sea of Love. It was their biggest hit in the UK, spending 10 weeks on the chart, and was also a big hit in Ireland, where it reached the top ten.

Written by guitarist Pat Gribben, "Broken Land" peaked at No. 20 on the UK Singles Chart, and was also the most-played song on BBC Radio 1 in 1988.

It references experiences of the Troubles.

Charts

Music 4 Ukraine version
In 2022, a cover version was released as a charity single titled "Heal This Broken Land". This version of "Broken Land" features Mark Shaw of Then Jerico, Nick Heyward, T'Pau's Carol Decker, the Christians, Nathan Moore of Brother Beyond and Doctor and the Medics. On 30 October 2022, the single, credited to Music 4 Ukraine, had reached number 17 on The Heritage Chart, as seen on Talking Pictures TV.

References

1988 songs
1988 singles
The Adventures songs
Elektra Records singles
Music videos directed by Mary Lambert